Lucifer Samael Morningstar is a character who appears in American comic books published by DC Comics. He is an adaptation of Lucifer—the Biblical fallen angel and devil of Christianity—and is one of the most powerful beings in the DC Universe. Though various versions of the Devil have been presented by DC Comics, this interpretation by Neil Gaiman debuted in The Sandman #4 in 1989. Lucifer appears primarily as a supporting character in The Sandman and as the protagonist of the spin-off Lucifer.

The spin-off series Lucifer (2000–2006) written by Mike Carey depicts his adventures on Earth, Heaven, and in the various other realms of his family's creations and in uncreated voids after abandoning Hell in The Sandman. Lucifer also appears as a supporting character in issues of The Demon, The Spectre, and other DC Universe comics. Two angels, a human, and briefly Superman have taken his place as ruler of Hell.

Lucifer made his live-action debut in the 2005 film Constantine, played by Swedish actor Peter Stormare. An alternate version is played by Welsh actor Tom Ellis in the television series Lucifer (2016–2021). Ellis also made a cameo as the character in the Arrowverse crossover Crisis on Infinite Earths (2020). English actress Gwendoline Christie portrays a version in the Netflix television series The Sandman (2022).

Fictional character biography
In the earlier related series  The Sandman, written by Neil Gaiman, Lucifer abandoned his lordship over Hell. While Lucifer had previously appeared in various stereotypical guises in earlier DC Comics books, Gaiman's version was premised on English poet and prose writer John Milton's Paradise Lost. At Gaiman's request of the artist, Lucifer looks like David Bowie at the time. In The Sandman, Lucifer had ruled as Lord of Hell for 10 billion years after rebelling three seconds after Creation. Over that time, he had manipulated the various demons of Hell against each other, provided a place for dead mortals to be tormented, and led the war against Heaven.

However, at some point during his rule, he had become bored with his existence. He became tired of the various stereotypes and prejudices that mortals held of the devil, such as the idea that he purchased and traded for souls, which was largely untrue, and that he forced mortals to commit evil acts. He had become tired of his reign over Hell and felt it an unfair punishment that he should have to rule there forever simply because he once rebelled. In The Sandman story "Season of Mists", Lucifer expels all the demons and damned souls from Hell before closing Hell's gates and handing over the key to Hell to Dream of the Endless, the title character of the Sandman series. Eventually, control of Hell was handed over to two angels, Duma (the angel of silence) and Remiel ("set over those who rise"), while Lucifer simply retired to Earth, initially to Perth, Western Australia and later to Los Angeles, California.

By the end of the series, however, it is revealed that Hell was not a punishment but a gift: being the furthest possible place from the throne of light, Lucifer could be separated from God as far as possible. Lucifer never created the physical features of Hell—Hell created itself around him.

Solo series
Lucifer was the main character in an eponymous series that ran for 75 issues (plus the Lucifer: Nirvana one-shot issue) from June 2000 to August 2006, the entire run of which was written by Mike Carey (this series was preceded by Carey's The Sandman Presents: Lucifer miniseries in 1999). To Carey, the essence of the character was:

"We play safe. Most of us do, most of the time... but Lucifer doesn't know the meaning of safe, and he never bothers to look down at the tramlines. He does whatever the hell he likes, picks his fights where he finds them and generally wins... following [his] own will and [his] own instincts to the very end of the line, no matter what the obstacles are."

In the series, Lucifer runs a piano bar (an element introduced in The Sandman story "The Kindly Ones") called "Lux" in Los Angeles. Lucifer is portrayed as a sophisticated and charming man, in accordance with the stereotypical gentleman devil.

The theme of the Lucifer series revolves around the free will problem. Carey's Lucifer is a figure representing the will and individual willpower, who challenges the "tyranny of predestination". While in Heaven's eyes this is blasphemy, Lucifer points out that the rebellion (and indeed all sin) and damnation as consequence were pre-planned by his Creator, God. Lucifer rejects God's rule and moral philosophy as tyrannical and unjust. The violent, aggressive, totalitarian, vengeful, and dictatorial aspects of Heaven's rule are represented mostly by the angel Amenadiel, who has a particular hatred of Lucifer and leads attacks of various kinds against him. The attacks include verbal criticism, marshaling the host of Heaven, as well as challenging him to individual combat—almost all of it without the slightest care for the countless innocent, unwilling and unwitting victims that he is more than willing to sacrifice for his own pride. For his part, Lucifer disdains Amenadiel, treating the latter's emotional outbursts with contempt, and repeatedly defeats Amenadiel's assaults with well-orchestrated, hidden plans. Ironically, however, it is often difficult to discern when Lucifer acts as a slave to predestination, and when he effectively acts according to his own free will.

Elaborate codes of conduct and schemes of entrapment based on these codes are vital elements of the DC/Vertigo magical universe. Lucifer appears as a master of these arts. In an encounter during the first Sandman story arc (around issue #5) a weakened Dream outsmarts Lucifer. Lucifer first swears revenge on Dream, but later comes to accept Dream's critique of his role and project as Lord of Hell. This inspires Lucifer's abdication, a vital element of the Sandman saga, and the point of departure for the Lucifer series.

For Lucifer, his word is his bond. As David Easterman, a character who sees himself as a victim of Lucifer, puts it:

When the Devil wants you to do something, he doesn't lie at all. He tells you the exact, literal truth. And he lets you find your own way to Hell.

Despite his theological title as the "Lord of Lies", the refusal to lie is central to the moral position of the character – he sees himself as a neutral or amoral facilitator of forces within individuals, and Lucifer actively and effectively combats what he regards as corrupting moral codes. While he avoids lying, his morality seldom extends to compassion and Lucifer regards the sacrifice of millions of souls as unimportant collateral damage; there are few, if any, beings that he respects and even fewer for whom he cares.

As the series opened in 2000, Lucifer's "restful" retirement was disturbed by a series of associates from his past. After various catalytic events, he endeavored to create a universe in competition with (and presumably against the wishes of) his father, Yahweh. This puts him on a collision course with several powerful mystical entities that have a vested interest in the new creation and draws the angelic host into the fray – including his brother, the archangel Michael Demiurgos, and his niece, Elaine Belloc.

The series paralleled The Sandman in several ways, with epic fantasy stories being told in arcs separated by one-shot episodes depicting a smaller, more personal tale. Unlike The Sandman, the series has had a consistent art team in Peter Gross and Ryan Kelly, with most of the odd issues illustrated by Dean Ormston. The title's 50th issue was penciled by P. Craig Russell, a homage to The Sandman #50. Structurally, the series mostly follows its own path. Numerous gods appear, with greater focus on Judeo-Christian religion (as viewed by Milton in Paradise Lost), Japanese mythology and Norse mythology than in The Sandman. As for the Endless themselves, Dream, Death, Delirium and Destiny appear, but their appearances are small and rare. Destiny, perhaps, plays the biggest role in so far as he represents predestination, which Lucifer of course finds "offensive as a concept", stating that Lucifer knows Destiny is "really just a SIDE effect of [Lucifer's] FATHER, or rather, his deterministic APPROACH to the act of creation."

Cover artists included Duncan Fegredo, Christopher Moeller, and Michael William Kaluta. The letters are inconsistent, with the first half of the series carrying particularly established fonts of Gaudium, Michael, and God, only to drop almost all of them, save Lucifer's, towards the end with numerous changes in the letterers.

The series ended in June 2006 with issue #75 and has thus far been collected in 11 books, with a one-shot issue (Lucifer: Nirvana) published as a smaller graphic novel. The series' parent title, The Sandman, also ran for 75 issues.

When Lucifer ventures outside Creation, he sees something resembling the comics pages themselves. At the end of the Lucifer story arc, God and the devil are no longer part of the universe, and a former human (Elaine Belloc) is instead presiding over it. New concepts for Heaven and Hell are created, inspired and influenced by other human or superhuman characters in the story. The new situation is described on several occasions by the fallen cherubs Gaudium and Spera. In essence, it is "growing up"; i.e., the need to find one's own truth and values without being directed by parents, elders, teachers, authority figures, etc.

Lucifer himself, his whole identity having been forged by that same motive, scoffs at his Father's final offer: to merge their beings (described by God as a potlatch) so that they can finally understand one another's perspective. As this would be the final expression of God's will (even when delivered from "outside the plan", as he puts it), Lucifer finds the ultimate expression of his own defiant will by refusing the bargain and travelling beyond his Father's influence into the undefined void.

The New 52
In September 2011, The New 52 rebooted DC's continuity. In this new timeline, Lucifer is much more influenced by traditional Christian theology. He is depicted as a malevolent, sadistic, and cunning fallen angel who is the ruler of Hell and seeks to possess human souls. He is held with great respect and fear by the denizens of Hell, who serve and obey him like a king. Lucifer himself, however, is mostly bored with his existence when the group known as the Demon Knights are captured by him during the early Middle Ages and passes the time by finding small amusements, such as watching the struggles and falls of Etrigan the Demon.

Lucifer made a more physical appearance in I...Vampire #19 after being tipped by John Constantine in destroying Cain. Lucifer immediately sentences Cain and drags him to Hell, though a being claiming to be him has appeared in the Modern Age of DC Comics to the superhero Deadman.

Note: The versions of Lucifer, Michael, Gabriel, Cain and Abel in mainstream New 52 are not of the same continuity as the versions in the previous or later Lucifer comics and are currently noncanonical to the Vertigo Sandman-Lucifer- Hellblazer continuity, in which Lucifer is not ruling Hell and Cain has not been destroyed or banished to Hell. In fact, Cain (restored to his original / New Earth version) appeared in DC's Dark Nights: Metal #2 as a member of the Immortal Men with his brother Abel. Cain, Abel, Gabriel, and Lucifer (the Pre-Flashpoint versions) currently appear in the Sandman Universe Comics from Vertigo. Cain, Abel, Daniel Hall (Dream), and Lucien also appeared in DCs' Dark Nights: Metal in these forms, re-establishing their Pre-New 52 incarnations in both DC and Vertigo.

Volume 2 (2015–2017)
This volume continues from where Lucifer left off before The New 52 (the New 52 version not being canon to this continuity). As this series begins, God is dead and Gabriel has accused Lucifer of His murder. Lucifer had motive and opportunity but claims he can prove his innocence. If Gabriel finds the killer and takes the culprit into custody, his sins will be forgotten, and he will be welcomed back into the Silver City. Despite the fact that Lucifer has just opened a nightclub on Earth and is hiding a mysterious wound, the two brothers set off to solve their Father's murder.

Note: This version is not considered canon to the Lucifer comics starting in late 2018. Those will continue from where the Mike Carey continuity ended.

Powers and abilities
Lucifer is continuously described as a celestial being of incalculable power due to his dominion over the very substance and knowledge of the formation of Creation. Through this understanding, Lucifer can shape the matter and foundation of the creation into anything he can imagine, including matter, energy and more abstract concepts, such as time. He once shaped Big Bang energies released by the death of his brother Michael into a new universe. However, he does have certain limitations, as he is still a creation of God; chiefly, he cannot create something out of nothing, unlike his Creator or brother. In some ways, this makes him the most disadvantaged, though not the weakest, of the higher angelic host. He needs existing matter (and where that is unavailable, the Demiurgic power of the Archangel Michael or that of God Himself) to provide the foundation for him to shape. In certain dimensions for reasons unknown, he is powerless and his mobility is limited without his wings. He is also not unbeatable, as Basanos was able to kill him with probability manipulation. He may choose to temporarily abandon his powers, including his immortality. In the story titled "Lilith", it is logically implied that God could destroy him at His own whim, which makes Lucifer sometimes wonder why He has not dealt with him already. He is so dangerous and unpredictable that even Death does not apply to him. He is also able to draw out a human's deepest desires, but due to his belief in free will, allows them to choose whether or not they should act on them, even if they make the choice on an unconscious level. Lucifer always tells the truth, but much like other trickster deities and spirits, will sometimes conveniently omit key details to fool others into doing something wrong.

He is never without the formidable resources of his brilliant intellect and his unbending will or inner strength, which allowed him to defy and confront his Father, as well as many other formidable opponents, without fear or doubt. Although Lucifer's overt exercise of power is limited in the books, if he is provoked to violence, his preference seems to be to use fire and light as a weapon. His original role was as "God's lamplighter", in which he used his will to condense clouds of hydrogen into star-masses and set them alight. As terrifying as they are brief, battles with Lucifer usually begin and end with him drawing down the flames of a super-heated main sequence star and incinerating to ash anything in the immediate area. However, the true reasons why he favors light and fire are partially explained in the story "Lilith" (from The Wolf Beneath the Tree).

Beyond his godly powers as an archangel, Lucifer possesses the common powers appropriate to an archangel of his position; superhuman strength, superhuman durability, flight, acidic blood (or, rather, he bleeds willpower, as depicted in when he reaches Yggdrasil in The Wolf Beneath the Tree), a devastating sonic cry, telepathy and the power to speak to and understand animals. In addition, he is a psychopomp, able to bring back from death any individual who he himself has slain. As an archangel, his powers are significantly superior to other angels.
According to Mike Carey Lucifer didn't want to be his mouth piece. More than any other character he ever written, Lucifer insisted on going his own  way it's safe to say that Lucifer is even above the writer. Dream said saving only the creator Lucifer is the most powerful being there is and dream knows everything means only the creator can beat Lucifer rest can not.

In The New 52 reboot, Lucifer is shown to be significantly less powerful, often using Hell's armies to do his bidding, and is susceptible to magic, shown when Excalibur was used to cut off his hand. He has no power over animal souls. He can open and close magical portals to Earth from Hell and back again. He can use this power to either summon or banish demons, as he does with Etrigan. He is clairvoyant, possessing a heightened perception or knowledge of time, even to the extent of being able to know the future.

Other versions
 The Unofficial Guide to the DC Universe lists Lucifer as first having appeared in a dream in Superman's Pal Jimmy Olsen #65 (1962). He appears when Jimmy Olsen attempts to memorize a devil's food cake recipe with his alleged photographic memory and dreams that he is in France 300 years in the past. Putting on the clothing of a bandit who has ditched them, Jimmy is arrested and sent to rot in the Devil's Island penal colony. A bald man known as Lord L offers five years of freedom for people to escape in exchange for their souls. Convinced that the magic the man uses is technological in nature, assuming him to be an ancestor of Lex Luthor, he asks to be returned whence he came, believing Lord L will be long dead by then and unable to claim him. Lord L shows up at his front door, still bald but now with a goatee, and insists that he is Lucifer and has given him over 300 years extra, but will dine with him before taking him, but disappears when Jimmy serves him cake. Superman wakes Jimmy soon after and reveals that the card he memorized was really for angel food cake, and this is why Lucifer disappeared.
 In Weird Mystery Tales #4 (January–February 1973), a story by Jack Oleck and Ruben Yandoc depicts Lucifer, looking much like his present incarnation, save for a few panels in which he appeared as a more traditional devil, held prisoner by an order of monks. It also presents a prisoner switch trick not unlike the one performed in The Sandman: Season of Mists, in addition to being hosted by Destiny, another character later used by Gaiman. In the story, Lucifer gave Philip Burton his form in order to trade places with him and fulfill his wish for immortality. Lucifer walked away in the body of the elderly Burton.
 A character called Lucifer the Fallen Angel appears in Blue Devil #31 (the final issue of the series). He has angelic wings and a halo, and his face includes dark facial hair. He does not have horns. Madame Xanadu recognizes that even with a magic book, he is not the real Lucifer. He is simply a washed-up actor who decided to be a costumed criminal for a living. He is dragged into Hell on a train at the end of the issue.
 The Unofficial Guide to the DC Universe lists Lucifer's first genuine Pre-Crisis appearance as DC Special Series #8. This character has hair and wings like Lucifer as he appears in The Sandman (vol. 2) #4, but he is red-skinned and has a face like a traditional devil, complete with a goatee, though his horns may be part of a headband. His appearance in the comic is brief, but he is specifically referred to as "Lucifer", rather than by other epithets. He has an advisory board consisting of Guy Fawkes, Benedict Arnold, Adolf Hitler, Jack the Ripper, Nero and Bluebeard. He has an operative, Edward Dirkes, set bombs, while using a bronze Batman statue transported by the Easy Company like a voodoo doll.
 Writer Garth Ennis introduced a character intended to be the devil as an antagonist in his run on the Hellblazer comic, however, as the character appeared at the same time as Gaiman's reuse of the Lucifer character, Ennis had to introduce a new back story for his character to distinguish the two. The Hellblazer character was named the First of the Fallen and was ruler of Hell both prior to and after Lucifer's reign. How this fits in with the reigns of the angels and Christopher Rudd has not been clarified, although the First of the Fallen mentions Duma and Remiel ruling Hell during Ennis' run. In the Hellblazer film adaption Constantine, however, Lucifer, portrayed by Peter Stormare, is an antagonist.
 Satan has appeared as a distinct figure in numerous DC Comics.
 In one of Vertigo's Fables spinoffs, Jack of Fables, the title character made various (unwise) pacts with several devils. One of them is heavily inspired by Milton's Paradise Lost.

Reception
In 2010, IGN's named Lucifer as the 68th Greatest Comic Book Villain of All Time.
Lucifer was ranked 38th by ComicsAlliance for their 50 sexiest male characters in comics.

Collected editions

Paperback
Lucifer, including the Sandman Presents miniseries and the Lucifer: Nirvana one-shot, has been collected together into eleven trade paperbacks:

Reprint editions

Hardcover
{| class="wikitable"
|-
! colspan=5|Deluxe hardcovers
|-
! Title !! Material collected !! Additional material || Publication date !! ISBN
|-
|Lucifer Omnibus Vol. 1 || Lucifer #1–35 ||
The Sandman Presents: Lucifer #1–3
Lucifer: Nirvana #1
| November 5, 2019 || 
|-
|Lucifer Omnibus Vol. 2 || Lucifer #36–75 ||
House of Mystery Halloween Annual #2: Infernal Bargains: Just Say No!
| November 3, 2020 || 
|-
|}

Volume 2

In other media
Television
 Lucifer appears in a self-titled TV series, portrayed by Tom Ellis.
 Lucifer makes a cameo appearance in the Arrowverse crossover "Crisis on Infinite Earths", portrayed again by Tom Ellis.
 Lucifer appears in The Sandman, portrayed by Gwendoline Christie. When discussing Christie's casting, Gaiman noted that, while Ellis reprising the role was considered, this version of Lucifer was much more faithful to the original comics and therefore it would have been difficult to reconfigure Ellis' version of Lucifer to fit in with the universe of The Sandman.

Film
Lucifer appears in Constantine'', portrayed by Peter Stormare. This version wears a white suit, sports tattoos, and constantly produces black oil from his feet.

References

External links

 
 
 
 

2000 comics debuts
Vertigo Comics titles
Fantasy comics
Comics by Mike Carey (writer)
Comics characters introduced in 1962
Comics characters introduced in 1989
Characters created by Neil Gaiman
Mythology in DC Comics
DC Comics angels
DC Comics characters who are shapeshifters
DC Comics characters who can move at superhuman speeds
DC Comics characters who can teleport
DC Comics characters who have mental powers
DC Comics characters who use magic
DC Comics characters with superhuman strength
DC Comics demons
DC Comics LGBT characters
DC Comics male supervillains
DC Comics deities
DC Comics fantasy characters
DC Comics telepaths
DC Comics telekinetics
Fiction about the Devil
Comics spin-offs
Fictional characters who can manipulate reality
Fictional characters who can manipulate time
Fictional characters who can manipulate sound
Fictional characters with elemental transmutation abilities
Fictional characters with dimensional travel abilities
Fictional characters with immortality
Fictional characters with precognition
Fictional characters with fire or heat abilities
Fictional characters who can manipulate darkness or shadows
Fictional characters with energy-manipulation abilities
Fictional characters who can change size
Fictional soul collectors
Fictional dictators
Fictional princes
Fictional kings
Fictional LGBT characters in television
Fictional pansexuals
DC Comics television characters
Vertigo Comics characters
Tarot in fiction
Gothic comics